Albert Alexander Pillans (25 February 1869 – 28 November 1901) was an English first-class cricketer. Pillan was a right-handed batsman.

Pillans represented Hampshire in three first-class matches in 1896 against Derbyshire, Yorkshire and Warwickshire. In his three matches for Hampshire, Pillans scored 82 runs at a batting average of 20.50, with a high score of 32*. With the ball Pillans took 6 wickets at a bowling average of 25.16, with best figures of 2/31.

In addition, Pillans also represented Ceylon in a non first-class match in 1896 against the touring Australians.

Pillans died at Maskeliya, Ceylon on 28 November 1901.

External links
Albert Pillans at Cricinfo
Albert Pillans at CricketArchive

1869 births
1901 deaths
English cricketers
All-Ceylon cricketers
Hampshire cricketers
English people of Sri Lankan descent